Sita Falls  is a waterfall located in Ranchi district in the Indian state of Jharkhand.

Description
The Sita fall is in Radhu river which is a tributary of the Subarnarekha River.

Location
Sita Falls located in Ranchi district.

References

Waterfalls of Jharkhand
Ranchi district